Alan Davidson is the name of:

Alan Davidson (food writer) (1924–2003), also British diplomat
Alan Hayes Davidson (1960–2018), architectural artist
Alan Davidson (cricketer, born 1929) (1929–2021), Australian Test cricketer
Alan Davidson (cricketer, born 1897) (1897–1962), Australian cricketer, played 4 first-class cricket matches for Victoria 1927–31
Alan Davidson (author) (born 1943), British author
Alan Davidson (Australian soccer) (born 1960), Australian association football player
Alan Davidson (Scottish footballer) (born 1960), Scottish football goalkeeper

See also
Allan Davidson (disambiguation)
Allen Turner Davidson (1819–1905), Confederate politician.